Re:covered was a music television show broadcast in the UK on BBC Choice in 2002 and hosted by Dermot O'Leary. Each of the ten half-hour shows featured three bands or artists who, in turn, played two songs – a current track of their own, and a cover version of their choice.

A Re:covered Elvis special left this usual format with artists performing just Elvis tracks – including The Flaming Lips performing Suspicious Minds, Sugababes performing Hound Dog and McAlmont and Butler performing Burning Love.

References

External links 
 

2002 British television series debuts
2003 British television series endings
2000s British music television series
BBC Television shows
English-language television shows